Aldo Federici (6 September 1920 – 7 February 1988) was an Italian ice hockey player. He competed in the men's tournament at the 1948 Winter Olympics and the 1956 Winter Olympics.

References

External links
 

1920 births
1988 deaths
Olympic ice hockey players of Italy
Ice hockey players at the 1948 Winter Olympics
Ice hockey players at the 1956 Winter Olympics
People from Davos